The Pinstripe Bowl is a National Collegiate Athletic Association (NCAA) Division I Football Bowl Subdivision (FBS) college football bowl game that is held at Yankee Stadium in The Bronx, New York City. First played in 2010, the game is organized by the New York Yankees, primary tenants of the venue, and is currently affiliated with the Atlantic Coast Conference and Big Ten Conference through 2025. The game previously had ties with the Big 12 Conference and the Big East Conference.

The winner of the game is awarded the George M. Steinbrenner Trophy, while the David C. Koch MVP Trophy is awarded to the bowl's most valuable player. The Pinstripe Bowl is one of three FBS bowls held in the Northeast, the others being the Military Bowl in Annapolis, Maryland and the Fenway Bowl, a game organized by the rival Boston Red Sox. It is also one of four bowls that are played outdoors in what are considered cold-weather cities, along with the Famous Idaho Potato Bowl held in Boise, Idaho.

History
On September 30, 2009, a "Yankee Bowl" was announced at a Yankee Stadium press conference by then-representatives of the involved parties: Yankees' minority owner Hal Steinbrenner, Mayor of New York City Michael Bloomberg, Big East Conference commissioner John Marinatto, and Big 12 Conference commissioner Dan Beebe. The most recent bowl in New York City proper had been the 1962 Gotham Bowl, which pitted Miami (FL) against Nebraska at the original Yankee Stadium. The newly announced bowl planned to pair the fourth-place team from the Big East Conference against the seventh-place team from the Big 12. In the event the Big 12 lacked an eligible team, independent Notre Dame could receive an invitation.

On March 9, 2010, the bowl's official name was announced to be the Pinstripe Bowl, with New Era Cap Company agreeing to sponsor the bowl for four years while ESPN agreed to broadcast the bowl for six years. The inaugural game was played on December 30, 2010. The first three editions of the bowl were each won by a Big East team over a Big 12 team. In 2013, Notre Dame was invited in place of a Big 12 team; the Fighting Irish defeated Rutgers of the Big East's successor, the American Athletic Conference ("The American").

Starting in 2014, the bowl featured an Atlantic Coast Conference (ACC) team against a Big Ten team. This was the same year that New Jersey-based Rutgers, the closest FBS school in the New York City area, moved to the Big Ten, and one year after Syracuse University, based in central New York state, moved to the ACC. The ACC agreed to a six-year deal with the Pinstripe Bowl, and the Big Ten agreed to the alignment for eight years. The ACC adopted a tiered system so that the same conference position would not necessarily go to the same bowl each season. The 2014 through 2019 editions of the bowl saw Big Ten teams compile a 5–1 record against ACC teams.

The 2020 edition of the bowl was cancelled, "out of an abundance of caution" due to the COVID-19 pandemic in the United States.

On August 16, 2022, Bad Boy Mowers was announced as the new title sponsor of the game.

Game results
Rankings are based on the AP Poll prior to the game being played.

Source:

MVPs

The MVP of the bowl is presented with the David C. Koch MVP Trophy, named after a former president of the New Era Cap Company.

Most appearances
Updated through the December 2022 edition (12 games, 24 total appearances).

Teams with multiple appearances

Teams with a single appearance
Won (9): Duke, Iowa, Maryland, Michigan State, Minnesota, Northwestern, Notre Dame, Penn State, Wisconsin

Lost (8): Indiana, Iowa State, Kansas State, Miami (FL), Pittsburgh, Virginia Tech, Wake Forest, West Virginia

Appearances by conference
Updated through the December 2022 edition (12 games, 24 total appearances).

 Records reflect conference membership at the time each game was played.
 The American's record includes appearances of Big East teams—Syracuse in 2010 and 2012, and Rutgers in 2011—as The American retains the charter of the original Big East, following its 2013 realignment.
 Independent appearances: Notre Dame (2013)

Game records

Media coverage

The bowl has been televised by ESPN since its inception, except for 2015, when it was carried by ABC.

References

External links
 Official site

Annual sporting events in the United States
 
College football bowls
Sports in the Bronx
Recurring sporting events established in 2010
2010 establishments in New York City